House of David is an album by saxophonist David Newman featuring performances recorded in 1967 for the Atlantic label.

Reception

Allmusic awarded the album 3 stars stating "This album boils with inventive hooks and the soulful combination of organ and guitar that would become more pop-oriented on subsequent Newman recordings".

Track listing
All compositions by David Newman except as indicated
 "I Wish You Love" (Charles Trenet) - 6:09
 "One Room Paradise" (J. Leslie McFarland) - 1:37
 "Little Sister" - 8:16
 "Miss Minnie" (Claude Johnson) - 2:29
 "Just Like a Woman" (Bob Dylan) - 4:32
 "House of David" - 3:48
 "Blue New" - 3:57
 "The Holy Land" (Cedar Walton) - 7:21

Personnel 
David Newman - tenor saxophone, flute
Kossi Gardner - organ
Ted Dunbar - guitar
Milt Turner - drums

References 

1967 albums
David "Fathead" Newman albums
Albums produced by Joel Dorn
Atlantic Records albums